{{Speciesbox
| image = Eudonia legnota female.jpg
| image_caption = Female
| image2 = Eudonia legnota male.jpg
| image2_caption = Male
| taxon = Eudonia legnota| authority = (Meyrick, 1884)
| synonyms = 

| synonyms_ref =
}}Eudonia legnota'' is a moth in the family Crambidae. This species was named by Edward Meyrick in 1884. It is endemic to New Zealand.

The wingspan is 18–23 mm. The forewings are pale brownish-ochreous, irrorated with dark fuscous or blackish on the veins. The first line is white, suffused with whitish anteriorly and margined with dark posteriorly. The second line is white and there is a hindmarginal row of black dots. The hindwings are ochreous-grey-whitish. Adults have been recorded on wing in December and January.

References

Moths described in 1884
Eudonia
Moths of New Zealand
Endemic fauna of New Zealand
Taxa named by Edward Meyrick
Endemic moths of New Zealand